Zafer Bilgetay (born 15 October 1956) is a retired Turkish football defender and later manager. He was capped five times for Turkey.

References

1956 births
Living people
Turkish footballers
Altay S.K. footballers
Bakırköyspor footballers
Turkey international footballers
Association football defenders
Turkish football managers
Altay S.K. managers
Mersin İdman Yurdu managers
Karşıyaka S.K. managers